Alex Antor Seignourel (born 1 April 1979) is an Andorran alpine skier. He represented Andorra at the 2002 and 2006 Winter Olympics. He was their flag bearer in the 2006 Opening Ceremonies.

Notes

References

External links
 
 
 

1979 births
Living people
Andorran male alpine skiers
Olympic alpine skiers of Andorra
Alpine skiers at the 2002 Winter Olympics
Alpine skiers at the 2006 Winter Olympics